Roderick Calder Kinkead-Weekes (born 15 March 1951) is a former South African born English cricketer.  Kinkead-Weekes was a right-handed batsman who played primarily as a wicketkeeper.

After attending Eton College, where he was the captain of the First XI, Kinkead-Weekes went up to Lincoln College, Oxford. He made his first-class debut for Oxford University in 1972 against Leicestershire.  He played 3 further first-class matches for the University in 1972, against Warwickshire, Yorkshire and finally Cambridge University.

In 1976, he played 2 first-class matches for Middlesex against Kent and the touring West Indians.  In his 6 first-class matches he scored 76 runs at a batting average of 10.85.  Behind the stumps he took 7 catches and made 3 stumpings. He toured Bangladesh with MCC in 1976-77.

References

External links
Roderick Kinkead-Weekes at Cricinfo
Roderick Kinkead-Weekes at CricketArchive

1951 births
Living people
Alumni of Lincoln College, Oxford
Cricketers from East London, Eastern Cape
English cricketers
Middlesex cricketers
Oxford University cricketers
People educated at Eton College
Wicket-keepers